The fourteenth election to Cardiganshire County Council took place in March 1934. It was preceded by the 1931 election and followed by the 1937 election.

Candidates
34 of the 50 councillors were returned unopposed and the Rev T. Mason Jones, now aged 75 who had served as chairman of the Council in 1899-1900 was returned unopposed at Devils Bridge. This resulted in fifteen contests, the same number as three years previously Political affiliations did not feature in the election.

Retiring aldermen

Eight aldermen retired, of whom only D. Rees Morgan (Bow Street) contested the election. The sitting councillor, Edward James, stood down in his favour.

Contested elections

Follwoing the fifteen contests, eleven new members were elected and four siting members defeated, including the Rev E.O. Jenkins who lost at Llandysul to retiring alderman Josiah Jones. Seats were not fought on political lines.

Outcome

Very little change took place as a result of an election in which only one sitting member lost his seat.

Results

Aberaeron

Aberbanc

Aberporth

Aberystwyth Division 1

Aberystwyth Division 2

Aberystwyth Division 3

Aberystwyth Division 4

Aberystwyth Division 5

Aberystwyth Division 6

Aeron
}

Borth

Bow Street

Cardigan North

Cardigan South

Cilcennin

Cwmrheidol

Devil's Bridge

Felinfach

Goginan

Lampeter Borough

Llanarth

Llanbadarn Fawr

Llanddewi Brefi

Llandygwydd

Llandysul North

Llandysul South

Llansysiliogogo

Llanfair Clydogau

Llanfarian

Llanfihangel y Creuddyn

Llangoedmor

Llangeitho

Llangrannog

Llanilar

Llanrhystyd

Llanllwchaiarn

Llansantffraed

Llanwnen

Llanwenog

Lledrod

Nantcwnlle

New Quay

Penbryn

Strata Florida

Taliesin

Talybont

Trefeurig

Tregaron

Troedyraur

Ysbyty Ystwyth

Election of Aldermen

In addition to the 50 councillors the council consisted of 16 county aldermen. Aldermen were elected by the council, and served a six-year term. Following the 1934 election, there were eight Aldermanic vacancies which were filled at the annual meeting.  
The following retiring aldermen were re-elected:
John Evans, Aberystwyth
Simon Davies, Felinfach
Richard Evans, Llangoedmor
Jenkin E. Evans, Talybont
In addition, the following four new aldermen were elected:
Rev E.J. Davies, Aberbanc
D. Rees Morgan (Bow Street)
M. Lloyd Williams, Ysbyty Ystwyth
Dr D.M. Davies, Aberaeron
The following retiring aldermen had been re-elected as members of the Council but were not re-elected as aldermen:
D.L. Herbert, Llangeitho
Josiah T. Jones, Llandysul

By-elections
Four by-elections were held following the election of aldermen. Two new members were elected after contests at Aberaeron and at Ysbyty Ystwyth. At Bow Street, Edward James was returned unopposed in place of D. Rees Morgan. A four cornered contest at Aberbanc led to the election of B.J. Davies, a farmer and member of Newcastle Emlyn Rural District Council, was elected.

Aberaeron by-election

Aberbanc by-election

Bow Street by-election

Ysbyty Ystwyth by-election

References

1934
1934 Welsh local elections
20th century in Ceredigion